Aaron T. Demarest (1841 – July 13, 1908) was an American carriage manufacturer and automobile body manufacturer. He built carriages in New York City for forty-eight years and luxury automobile bodies for 6 years.

Biography 
Demarest was born in Nyack, New York in 1841. In 1855 he moved to New York City. Five years later he started his own business. The business was located on Park Place. Soon thereafter he formed a business relationship with Gabriel C. Chevalier. They moved to 628 Broadway and had a business at this location for thirty years. In 1890 Demarest moved his business to his new Demarest Building at 335-339 Fifth Ave, which was the first building that had an electric elevator. The Demarest building, with the electric elevator installed by the Otis Brothers elevator firm, is on the southeast corner at Thirty-third Street.

In 1873 Demarest and his partner bought the carriage manufacturer Lawrence, Bradley and Pardee Company. The factory located at 61-67 Chapel Street in New Haven, Connecticut, grew to almost 200 workmen. In 1915 production of horse carriages stopped altogether and the factory closed.

Demarest built carriages in New York City at various locations for forty-eight years and additionally luxury automobile bodies at the Demarest Building for 6 years from 1902. Demarest moved to a new showroom at 57th Street and Broadway in 1909, occupying it until about 1917. He incorporated as A. T. Demarest Company around 1899.

Retirement and death 

One source says he died at the Kent House in Greenwich, Connecticut where he made his home in the summer time. He had been ill for weeks of ptomaine poisoning contracted at a clambake while attending the commencement exercises at Yale where his grandson had graduated. He was improving when he stricken with paralysis.

Another source says he had a stroke in 1902 and ultimately turned over his business to his brother, William R. Demarest and son, Warren G. Demarest. They then ran the business with the firm's secretary, Gabriel C. Chevalier. Demarest died July on 13, 1908, in Greenwich. The cause of death of ptomaine poisoning was from eating clams. This happened at a dinner given in honor of the Yale University graduation of his grandson, Francesco Whitmore. He was survived by his two sons, Warren G. and John Howard, and his daughter, Mrs. F.B. Whitmore.

Demarest left a net estate worth over $200,000. His Will stated that Mrs. Annie E. Whittemore, his daughter and his sons Warren G. Demarest and John H. Demarest each to receive some $75,000. His sister, Mrs. Maria Jane Smith was to receive an annuity of $500. The stock of the company was divided among his three children. His son Warren became the president of the Demarest organization with a five thousand dollar salary.

References

Sources

External links 
 

1841 births
1908 deaths
Businesspeople from New York City
American automotive pioneers
19th-century American businesspeople